is a 2015 Japanese romantic drama film directed by Kiyoshi Kurosawa, starring Tadanobu Asano and Eri Fukatsu. It is adapted from Kazumi Yumoto's novel Kishibe no Tabi. It screened in the Un Certain Regard section at the 2015 Cannes Film Festival, where Kurosawa won the prize for Best Director. It was released in Japan on 1 October 2015.

Plot
Mizuki (Eri Fukatsu) is a piano teacher who gives lessons to children. Her husband, Yusuke (Tadanobu Asano), has been missing for three years. He comes back home as a ghost and tells her that he died from drowning in the sea. His body disappeared at sea, eaten by crabs. Since then he has traveled through Japan and made friends with the living and other people "like him". He asks Mizuki to accompany him on a journey. Yusuke shows her the beautiful places he discovered and visit the people who have been kind to him.

Cast
 Tadanobu Asano as Yusuke
 Eri Fukatsu as Mizuki
 Masao Komatsu as Shimakage
 Yū Aoi as Tomoko
 Akira Emoto as Hoshitani

Release
The film screened in the Un Certain Regard section at the 2015 Cannes Film Festival on 17 May 2015. It also screened at the 2015 Toronto International Film Festival and the 2015 New York Film Festival. It was released in Japan on 1 October 2015.

Reception
On review aggregator website Rotten Tomatoes, the film holds an approval rating of 57% based on 23 reviews, with an average rating of 6.21/10. On Metacritic, the film has a weighted average score of 52 out of 100, based on 6 critics, indicating "mixed or average reviews".

David Rooney of The Hollywood Reporter gave the film an unfavorable review, saying: "Too much lethargic, unclear plotting and saccharine melodrama mean the gentle film is seldom as intriguing as its premise, even if Kurosawa as always provides arresting visual moments and has a commanding way of building atmosphere out of stillness." Meanwhile, Maggie Lee of Variety said: "Fans of Kurosawa's earlier psycho-thrillers may desire more eeriness and visual panache, but those who've accepted the helmer's conscious change of tune and pace should be gently touched." Derek Elley of Film Business Asia gave the film a 7 out of 10, commenting that Kurosawa "bounces back with a touching, offbeat love story between life and death."

Cahiers du cinéma placed the film at number 10 on the "Top 10 Films of 2015" list.

Accolades

References

External links
 Official website (archive)
 

2015 films
2015 romantic drama films
2010s drama road movies
Japanese romantic drama films
Japanese ghost films
2010s Japanese-language films
Films directed by Kiyoshi Kurosawa
2010s Japanese films